Fateh Singhpura is a railway station on the West Central railway network at Suroth, Suroth Tehsil in India. It comes under the Kota railway division of West Central Railway zone
Fatehsinghpura is a D-Grade station on the Delhi–Mumbai route.

See also 
 Hindaun Tehsil
 Hindaun
 Hindaun (Rajasthan Assembly constituency)
 Suroth
 Hindaun City railway station
 Hindaun City bus depot
 Jaggar Dam
 Jalsen Reservoir
 Nakkash Ki Devi - Gomti Dham
 Kaila Devi Temple
 Shri Mahaveer Ji temple
 Narsinghji Temple
 Karauli district
 Educational institutions in Hindaun Subdivision
 Kyarda Hanumanji Temple
 Timangarh

Railway stations in Karauli district
Kota railway division